"Half the World" is a song and single by progressive rock band Rush from their 1996 album Test for Echo. A music video was made for the song. The song peaked at number 6 on the U.S. Billboard Mainstream Rock Tracks chart.

Track listing

Charts

See also
List of Rush songs

References

1996 singles
Rush (band) songs
Songs written by Alex Lifeson
Songs written by Geddy Lee
Songs written by Neil Peart
Song recordings produced by Peter Collins (record producer)
1996 songs
Atlantic Records singles